The Libelle was an Austrian three-wheeled microcar built in Innsbruck by Libelle Fahrzeugbau- und Vertriebsgesellschaft between 1952 and 1954. It had a one-cylinder two-stroke Rotax engine with 199 cc and 8.5 hp, and 4 gears.

About 50 are believed to have been built; the only known "survivor" is in the exposition of the RRR scooter museum in Eggenburg, Austria.

See also 
List of microcars by country of origin
Walter Zeichner: Kleinwagen International, Motorbuch-Verlag. Stuttgart 1999.

External links
Photographs of the Libelle
Web page of the RRRollipop Museum

Microcars
Car manufacturers of Austria
Three-wheeled motor vehicles

Cars introduced in 1952